"Yours Until Tomorrow" is a song written by Gerry Goffin and Carole King, recorded by Dee Dee Warwick in 1968. It was used as the B-side to her recording of "I'm Gonna Make You Love Me." Versions by, respectively, Vivian Reed and Gene Pitney performed on music charts.

Charted cover versions
Musical theatre actress Vivian Reed covered "Yours Until Tomorrow" in 1968.  Originally a B-side, her version reached number 113 on Billboard Bubbling Under the Hot 100, number 93 on the Cash Box Top 100, and number 87 on Canada's RPM Top Singles.  The song was her only chart hit. 

Gene Pitney recorded his version for his album She's a Heartbreaker, also called Pitney Today in the UK. The version peaked at number 34 in 1968.

References

External links
 
 
 
 
 

1966 songs
1968 singles
Dee Dee Warwick songs
Engelbert Humperdinck songs
Gene Pitney songs
Epic Records singles
Mercury Records singles
Atlantic Records singles
Songs written by Carole King
Songs with lyrics by Gerry Goffin